The New Pantai Expressway (Malay: Lebuhraya Baru Pantai) (known as NPE) , is a controlled-access highway in the Klang Valley region of Peninsular Malaysia. The  expressway runs parallel to the Federal Highway, between Subang Jaya, Selangor in the southwest and Bangsar, Kuala Lumpur in the northeast.

History and pioneer routes

The expressway was known as Jalan Subang Utama (Persiaran Tujuan–PJS), Jalan Klang Lama (Federal Highway–Jalan Templer side) and Jalan Pantai Dalam (Jalan Bangsar–Kampung Pantai Dalam side). The project was awarded to Maxtro Engineering Sdn Bhd, a subsidiary of Berjaya Group but it was handed over to the new concessionaire, New Pantai Expressway Sdn Bhd, a subsidiary of IJM Corporation Berhad in 2002.

It was constructed between 2000 and 2004. Construction of the expressways was led by Road Builder (M) Holdings Berhad (RBH) which in 2007 was acquired by IJM Corporation Berhad. Phase 1, which is between Jengka roundabout and Bandar Sunway was completed in 2002. The next sections from Bandar Sunway to Pantai Baharu (Phase 2) and Pantai to Salak South (Phase 3: Salak Link) were completed in 2003. During construction, the concessionaire temporarily relocated 2,000 squatters in Pantai Dalam while building them 980 low-cost apartments close to their settlement. The expressway was officially opened on 30 April 2004.

Tujuan Interchange which replaced a T-junction was constructed between 2004 and 2006. The Bulatan Gasing ramp from NPE to Jalan Gasing was also constructed between 2004 and 2006. A special ramp to Sunway Pyramid's parking floor was constructed between January and November 2007. It was opened in December 2007.

Original routes
The construction of the New Pantai Expressway includes the acquisition and upgrades of several major roads as follows:-

Features
Among its features are a flyover towards Bangsar and the Kewajipan Ramp, a ramp from Jalan Kewajipan to the expressway. There are no laybys and rest and service areas on this expressway. Another feature is the shopping complex landmark at Bandar Sunway, Sunway Pyramid. In December 2007 the special ramp to the Sunway Pyramid's parking floor was opened. The Indah Water Konsortium's Sewerage Treatment Plant Pantai Dalam is located along the expressway.

Controversial issues

Kampung Dato' Harun toll plaza near Taman Medan
About 50 people in Petaling Jaya Selatan staged a peaceful rally at the New Pantai Expressway’s (NPE) Kampung Dato' Harun toll plaza near Taman Medan here, demanding the NPE toll be abolished as it was burdening the people, especially nearby residents. Acting Petaling Jaya Selatan UMNO chief Raja Datuk Hanipuddin Raja Datuk Nong Chik said the residents had to spend an average of RM500 monthly on the toll.

“They have to pay RM1.60, even though their houses are located just 200m from the toll plaza. The toll charge is probably the highest in the Klang Valley,” he told.

On 13 February 2009, the PJS 2 toll plaza for Kuala Lumpur-bound was abolished. This was at the request of the government following complaints from nearby residents who had no alternative route in a Kuala Lumpur-bound direction and were thus compelled to pay too frequently. The government agreed to abolish the toll plaza from Sunway Pyramid heading towards Kuala Lumpur begimning 00.01 hours 14 February 2009.

Tolls
The New Pantai Expressway using opened toll systems.

As part of an initiative to facilitate faster transaction at the Pantai Dalam, PJS 5 and PJS 2 Toll Plaza, all toll transactions at three toll plazas on the New Pantai Expressway will be conducted electronically via Touch 'n Go cards or SmartTAGs starting 13 January 2016.

Toll rates

(Starting 15 October 2015)

Pantai Dalam and PJS 5 Toll Plazas

PJS 2 Toll Plaza

List of interchanges

References

External links
 IJM
 NPE

2002 establishments in Malaysia
Expressways and highways in the Klang Valley